Pythias was a 1st-century female Roman slave (possibly of Greek origin) in the household of Octavia, the first wife of the Emperor Nero, who divorced Octavia in 62 AD to marry Poppaea Sabina.  To fabricate evidence that could be used to justify murdering Octavia after the divorce, Poppaea and Tigellinus, the Prefect of the Praetorian Guard, attempted to compel Octavia's maids to make false claims of her adultery during her marriage to Nero. Pythias refused. She was tortured, but she famously proclaimed that Octavia's genitalia were cleaner than Tigellinus' mouth.

The earliest surviving version of the story appears to be that told by the Roman historian Tacitus (c56 - c120 AD) in his Annals, although he doesn't name the maid:

A later version of the story, which names Pythias as the maid, was told by the Roman historian Cassius Dio (c155 - c235 AD) in his Roman History:

References

1st-century Roman women